Loewen is a Canadian millwork manufacturer of wood window and door systems for residential and light commercial use.  The company uses Douglas Fir and Mahogany for its products.  Loewen targets the high-end market, and,  as of late 2019, has a network of several hundred dealers across North America, employing over 500 people.

History
The company was founded in 1905 by Cornelius Toews Loewen who established Loewen Millwork, based out of Steinbach, Manitoba, Canada.  Among its early products were items such as church pews and beekeeping equipment.  From the 1930s through the 1940s the company shifted to manufacturing pre-built windows and doors to supply the post-war boom in housing construction.  In the 1980s Loewen combined the company's old-world craftsmanship and work ethic with the most advanced production technology available at the time.

International expansion
Through the 90's, Loewen expanded its distribution into the United States and became one of the leading suppliers of high-end, custom wood windows and doors.

References

 Industry Canada - Canadian Company Capabilities, Complete Profile - C.P. Loewen Enterprises Ltd.
 Loewen, Cornelius Toews (1883-1960) - Global Anabaptist Mennonite Encyclopedia Online

External links 
Official website

Companies based in Manitoba
Steinbach, Manitoba